The Xukuruan languages are a language family proposed by Loukotka (1968) that links two extinct and poorly attested languages of eastern Brazil. The languages are:

Xukuru
Paratió

Loutkotka (1968) also lists the unattested Garañun (Garanhun), an extinct, undocumented language once spoken in the Serra dos Garanhuns.

Vocabulary
Loukotka (1968) lists the following basic vocabulary items for Shukurú and Paratio.

{| class="wikitable"
! gloss !! Shukurú !! Paratio
|-
! ear
| bandulák || bolúdo
|-
! tooth
| chilodé || vovó
|-
! man
| sheñupre || sheñup
|-
! sun
| kiá || kiá
|-
! moon
| klariːmon || limolago
|-
! earth
| krashishi || 
|-
! tobacco
| mãzyé || mazyaː
|}

Pompeu (1958)
These word lists of language varieties from the Serra do Urubá (also known as the Serra do Arorobá or Serra do Ororubá, located in the municipality of Pesqueira, Pernambuco) are reproduced from Pompeu Sobrinho (1958).

Below is a vocabulary collected by Domingos Cruz in Pesqueira, Pernambuco from his informant Rodrigues de Mendonça, who was originally from the Serra do Urubá:

{| class="wikitable sortable"
! Portuguese gloss (original) !! English gloss (translated) !! "Serra do Urubá"
|-
| cabeça || head || kreká, kri, ká
|-
| cabeça de vaca || cow head || kreká memêngo
|-
| chapéu || hat || kriákugo, kriá
|-
| chuva || rain || kraxixi
|-
| comida || food || kringó
|-
| comida boa || good food || kringó konengo
|-
| cachaça || cachaça (liquor) || irínka
|-
| bom, boa || good || konengo
|-
| chefe, mais velho || boss, older || taióp
|-
| deus || God || tupá
|-
| faca grande || big knife || xaníko
|-
| faca pequena || small knife || saquarék
|-
| homem || man || xiakrók
|-
| homem branco || white man || karé
|-
| homem índio || Indian man || xenunpe
|-
| homem defeituoso || deformed man || jajú
|-
| fome || hunger || xurák
|-
| inimigo || enemy || aredirí
|-
| ir embora || go away || nuntógo
|-
| mulher || woman || krippó
|-
| milho || corn || xigó
|-
| nevoeiro || fog || batukin
|-
| lua || moon || limolago
|-
| sol || sun || oraci
|-
| pedra || stone || krá
|-
| pedra (em cima da terra) || stone (on top of the earth) || krá xixí
|-
| pé || foot || poiá
|-
| defeito || defect || guxú
|-
| pé defeituoso || defective foot || poiá guxú
|-
| ruim || bad || aguá, pigó
|-
| homem branco ruim || bad white man || karé aguá
|-
| homem branco bom || good white man || karé konengo
|-
| O inimigo vem aí. || The enemy is coming. || arediri arediri
|}

Vocabulary collected by Domingos Cruz from his informant Pedro Rodrigues, who was originally from the sitio of Gitó in the Serra do Urubá:

{| class="wikitable sortable"
! Portuguese gloss (original) !! English gloss (translated) !! Gitó variety
|-
| aguardente || aguardente (liquor) || orinka
|-
| aldeiamento || village || taiopo maritáro
|-
| arco (arma) || bow (weapon) || tamaingú, temaigú
|-
| carne || meat || inxi, ixi
|-
| fome || hunger || xurák
|-
| negro (homem) || black (man) || taká
|-
| cabra || goat || krexkuák jãtarinta
|-
| negra || black || taká jipu
|-
| onça || jaguar || jetôme
|-
| raça, tribo || race, tribe || xekurú
|-
| marinheiro (estrangeiro) || sailor (foreigner) || karé irut
|-
| carne || meat || inxin
|-
| comedor de carne || meat eater || inzin aragogú
|-
| mentiroso || liar || jupegúgo
|-
| lua || moon || limolágo
|-
| sol || sun || orací
|-
| deus || God || tupá
|-
| Nossa Senhora || Our Lady (Virgin Mary) || Tamaipí
|}

Vocabulary collected by José Joaquim in Rio Branco, Pernambuco of a language spoken in the Serra do Urubá:

{| class="wikitable sortable"
! Portuguese gloss (original) !! English gloss (translated) !! "Serra do Urubá"
|-
| bom dia || good morning || degómen
|-
| cacete || club || kirí, quirí
|-
| cabeça || head || krêkió
|-
| batata || potato || baká, koxó
|-
| altar || altar || oiô
|-
| canela (tíbia) || shin; tibia || gatí
|-
| canela fina || fine shin || gatirí
|-
| cachaça || cachaça (liquor) || urínka
|-
| ? || ? || urinka karóba
|-
| mão || hand || kêerakê
|-
| dedo || finger || atirí, tirí
|-
| nariz || nose || korõzó
|-
| espiga (milho) || ear (of corn) || tók, tóque
|-
| fumo, tabaco || smoke, tobacco || mãjá
|-
| Como vai? || How are you? || adeusá
|-
| livro || book || quatirá
|-
| fino || thin || irí
|-
| longe || far || tigí
|-
| ir embora || go away || ombêira
|-
| livrar-se || get rid of || muntógo
|-
| feijão || bean || jejá
|-
| cara, rosto || face || nãí
|-
| cara feia || ugly face || naiogo
|-
| negro (homem) || black (man) || taka
|-
| olhar || look || antiá
|-
| pano || cloth || mití (?)
|-
| pano velho (farrapo) || old cloth (rag) || takó
|-
| mandioca ou macaxeira || cassava or manioc || xaká
|-
| milho || corn || xigó
|-
| vertir || pour, spill || tadí
|-
| roupa || clothes || kunãgo
|-
| roupa nova || new clothes || tiliká
|-
| roupa velha || old clothes || takó
|-
| girau || turned || koiá
|-
| livro || book || katirá, quatirá
|-
| tamboeira (de milho) || poorly sprouted corn || boró tiga
|-
| espiga de milho || corn cob || tiga gugá
|}

References

 
Language families
Indigenous languages of Northeastern Brazil